Asoka Weeraratna (December 12, 1918 – July 2, 1999) was a Sri Lankan (Sinhala) Buddhist missionary, who founded the German Dharmaduta Society in 1952. He is also the founder of  the Berlin Buddhist Vihara, one of the oldest Buddhist temples in Europe and Mitirigala Nissarana Vanaya, a famous meditation monastery in the Western Province, Sri Lanka. Asoka Weeraratna later entered the Order of Buddhist monks in 1972 as Ven. Mitirigala Dhammanisanthi Thera and spent his later life as a forest monk at the Mitirigala Nissarana Vanaya for a period of 27 years.

References

External links
 Asoka Weeraratna 
 Life sketch of Ven. Mitirigala Dhammanisanthi Thera (Asoka Weeraratna) 
 Sri Lanka’s admirable Buddhist missionary achievements in the West
 Dharmasena Weeraratna - An Appreciation
 Promoting Buddhism in Europe by Bhikkhu Bodhi 
 Inland fisheries and Buddhism

1918 births
1999 deaths
Sinhalese monks
People from Galle
Sri Lankan Buddhist missionaries
Alumni of Mahinda College